Uberto Visconti di Modrone (23 February 1871 – 13 January 1923) was an Italian equestrian. He competed in the equestrian long jump event at the 1900 Summer Olympics.

References

External links

1871 births
1923 deaths
Italian male equestrians
Olympic equestrians of Italy
Equestrians at the 1900 Summer Olympics
Sportspeople from Milan